The Fokker XA-7 was a prototype attack aircraft ordered in December 1929, and first flown in January 1931 by Fokker and then General Aviation Corporation after it bought Fokker-America in 1930, and entered in a competition held by the United States Army.  However, the Curtiss A-8 won the competition, and A-7 development was not continued.

Design and development
The XA-7 was a two-seat low-wing all-metal monoplane design. It featured a thick cantilever wing, tunnel radiator and two closely spaced open cockpits.

Despite some innovative features, the XA-7 did not proceed past flight test status. After testing, the sole prototype was scrapped.

Specifications (Fokker XA-7)

See also

References

Citations

Bibliography

 Wagner, Ray. American Combat Planes of the 20th Century, Third Enlarged Edition. New York: Doubleday, 1982. .

External links

 General Aviation (Fokker) XA-7

A-7
A-07, Fokker
Low-wing aircraft
Single-engined tractor aircraft
Aircraft first flown in 1931
Fokker aircraft